Y+L amino acid transporter 1 is a protein that in humans is encoded by the SLC7A7 gene.

Interactions
SLC7A7 has been shown to interact with SLC3A2.

See also
 Heterodimeric amino acid transporter
 Solute carrier family
 Lysinuric protein intolerance

References

Further reading

External links
 GeneReviews/NCBI/NIH/UW entry on Lysinuric Protein Intolerance

Solute carrier family